Paulilatino is a comune (municipality) in the Province of Oristano in the Italian region Sardinia, located about  northwest of Cagliari and about  northeast of Oristano.

Paulilatino borders the following municipalities: Abbasanta, Bauladu, Bonarcado, Fordongianus, Ghilarza, Santu Lussurgiu, Solarussa, Villanova Truschedu, Zerfaliu.

Main sights

The archaeological complex of Santa Cristina dates from the 12 century BC and consists of a well and various ceremonial buildings. It is one of the most important sites of the Nuragic civilization. Central to the facilities is a well, built with well smoothed basaltic ashlars and consisting of three architectural elements: an elliptical enclosure, stairs shaped like a trapezium and a circular chamber with an ogival ceiling that contains the water. In front of the well there are remains of Nuragic villager huts with and a gathering place.

Other sights include numerous nuraghe and domus de janas, and the Aragonese-Gothic-style church of San Teodoro.sss

References

External links

 3D view of the archeological complex of Santa Cristina
 www.comune.paulilatino.or.it/

Cities and towns in Sardinia